Year 1450 (MCDL) was a common year starting on Thursday (link will display the full calendar) of the Julian calendar.

Events 
 January–December 
 February 7 – John de la Pole, 2nd Duke of Suffolk, marries Lady Margaret Beaufort.
 February 26 – Francesco Sforza enters Milan after a siege, becoming Duke of the city-state, and founding a dynasty that will rule Milan for a century.
 March – French troops under Guy de Richemont besiege the English commander in France, Edmund Beaufort, 1st Duke of Somerset, in Caen.
 April 15 – Battle of Formigny: French troops under the Comte de Clermont defeat an English army under Sir Thomas Kyriel and Sir Matthew Gough, which was attempting to relieve Caen.
 May 8 – Jack Cade's Rebellion: Kentishmen revolt against King Henry VI of England.
 May 9 – Abdal-Latif Mirza, a Timurid dynasty monarch, is assassinated.
 May 13 – Charles VIII of Sweden, also serving as Carl I of Norway, is declared deposed from the latter throne, in favor of Christian I of Denmark.
 June 18 – Battle of Solefields (Sevenoaks): Jack Cade's rebels are driven from London by loyal troops.
 July 6 – Caen surrenders to the French. 
 July 12 – Jack Cade is slain in a skirmish.
 August 12 – Cherbourg, the last English territory in Normandy, surrenders to the French. 
 October 5 – Jews are expelled from Lower Bavaria, by order of Duke Ludwig IX.
 November 3 – The University of Barcelona is founded.
 November 23 – First Siege of Krujë: Albanian troops are victorious, forcing an Ottoman army of approximately 100,000 men to retreat from Albania.

 Date unknown 
 Machu Picchu (Quechua: Machu Pikchu, "Old mountain"), a pre-Columbian Inca site located 2,400 meters (7,875 ft) above sea level, is believed to be under construction.
 A religious sacrifice of over a hundred children is performed around this time, outside of the ancient city of Chan Chan (near modern Trujillo), on the north coast of Peru.
 Johannes Gutenberg has set up his movable type printing press, as a commercial operation in Mainz, by this date.

Births 
 February 12 – Yejong of Joseon, Joseon King (d. 1469)
 May 18 – Piero Soderini, Florentine statesman (d. 1513)
 June 22 – Eleanor of Naples, Duchess of Ferrara (d. 1493)
 July 25 – Jakob Wimpfeling, Renaissance humanist (d. 1528)
 August 18 – Marko Marulić, Croatian poet (d. 1524)
 September 25 – Ursula of Brandenburg, Duchess of Münsterberg-Oels and Countess of Glatz (d. 1508)
 November 12 – Jacques of Savoy, Count of Romont, Prince of Savoy (d. 1486)
 date unknown
 William Catesby, English politician (d. 1485)
 Bartolomeo Montagna, Italian painter (d. 1523)
 Heinrich Isaak, German-Dutch composer (d. 1517)
 John Cabot, English explorer (d. 1499)
 probable
 Kamāl ud-Dīn Behzād, Persian leader of the Herat school
 Hieronymus Bosch, Dutch painter (d. 1516)
 Gaspar Corte-Real, Portuguese explorer (d. 1501)
 Juan de la Cosa, Spanish navigator and cartographer (d. 1510)
 Josquin des Prez, Dutch composer (d. 1521)
 Heinrich Isaac, Franco-Flemish composer (d. 1517)
 Hugh Oldham, Bishop of Exeter (d. 1519)
 Pietro Antonio Solari, Italian architect (d. 1493)
 Petrus Thaborita, Dutch historian and monk (d. 1527)
 Nyai Gede Pinateh, Javanese merchant (d. 1500)

Deaths 
 January 9 – Adam Moleyns, English courtier and Bishop of Chichester
 February 9 – Agnès Sorel, mistress of Charles VII of France (b. c. 1422)
 April 8 – Sejong the Great of Joseon, ruler of Korea (b. 1397)
 May 2 – William de la Pole, 1st Duke of Suffolk, English military leader (born 1396)
 May 9 – Abdal-Latif Mirza, ruler of Transoxania
 July 2 – Ranuccio Farnese il Vecchio, Italian condottiero (b. c. 1390)
 July 4 – James Fiennes, 1st Baron Saye and Sele, English soldier and politician (b. c. 1395)
 July 18 – Francis I, Duke of Brittany (b. 1414)
 July 26 – Cecily Neville, Duchess of Warwick (b. 1424)
 August 15 – Alberto da Sarteano, Italian Franciscan friar and papal legate (b. 1385)
 August 27 – Reginald West, 6th Baron De La Warr, English politician (b. 1395)
 August 31 – Isabella of Navarre, Countess of Armagnac (b. 1395)
 September 16 – Louis Aleman, French cardinal
 September 22 – William Tresham, English politician
 October 1 – Leonello d'Este, Marquis of Ferrara, Italian noble (b. 1407)
 November 3 – Paola Colonna, Lady of Piombino (b. c. 1378)
 November 5 – John IV, Count of Armagnac (b. 1396)

References